Henry Busch may refer to:
 Henry Busch (architect)
 Henry Busch (serial killer)